Olavi Köppä (born 16 May 1951) is a Finnish speed skater. He competed in three events at the 1976 Winter Olympics.

References

External links
 

1951 births
Living people
Finnish male speed skaters
Olympic speed skaters of Finland
Speed skaters at the 1976 Winter Olympics
People from Kangasala
Sportspeople from Pirkanmaa